is a Japanese manga series written and illustrated by Syun Matsuena. Matsuena first published a manga titled Tatakae! Ryōzanpaku Shijō Saikyō no Deshi, which ran in Shogakukan's Shōnen Sunday Super from 1999 to 2002. Shijō Saikyō no Deshi Ken'ichi is a remake of the series, and was serialized in Shogakukan's Weekly Shōnen Sunday from April 2002 to September 2014, with its chapters collected in sixty-one tankōbon volumes.

A 50-episode anime television series adaptation produced by TMS Entertainment aired on TV Tokyo from October 2006 to September 2007. Brain's Base produced an 11-episode original video animation (OVA) series released between March 2012 and May 2014. The anime television series was licensed in North America by Funimation in 2008, but the rights to the series expired in 2018. It was re-licensed by Discotek Media in 2020.

As of February 2012, the Kenichi: The Mightiest Disciple manga had over 12 million copies in circulation.

Plot
The story focuses on Kenichi Shirahama, a 15-year-old high school student and a long-time victim of bullying. At the beginning of the story, he befriends transfer student Miu Fūrinji; and desires to become stronger, he follows her to Ryōzanpaku, a dojo housing several masters of diverse martial arts, led by her grandfather Hayato Fūrinji. 

After learning basics from Miu, Kenichi overcomes a high-ranking member of the school's karate club and becomes a target for all the delinquents in the school. While initially training to protect himself, Kenichi eventually becomes a full disciple of Ryōzanpaku and becomes enamored of Miu. Subsequently, Kenichi's daily routine is divided between training under the six masters of Ryōzanpaku, and his fights against the members of 'Ragnarok', a gang of bullies trying alternately to recruit or to vanquish him. 

After Ragnarok is disbanded, Kenichi and Miu are targeted by Yomi, a group of disciples personally trained by a master of an organization rivaling Ryōzanpaku, Yami. While the masters of Ryōzanpaku and their allies follow the principle of always sparing their opponents' lives (Katsujin-ken), the members of Yami believe that any means of defeating an opponent is valid, including murder (Satsujin-ken). In the struggle between the two factions, Kenichi, Miu, and their allies fight the members of Yomi, while his masters confront the members of Yami. The conflict between the two factions culminates with the final battle to stop Yami's main objective, which is to usher in a new era of chaos and warfare in the world, also known as "The Eternal Sunset". Once the Eternal Sunset is prevented and their main leader is defeated, Yami and Yomi are disbanded as well. Kenichi then continues to train at Ryōzanpaku, and years later he becomes a famous novelist, but it's hinted that he also becomes Miu's husband and a martial arts master more powerful than her grandfather, the Elder, who had always sworn he would only allow Miu to marry someone capable of defeating him first.

Main characters

Protagonist; currently in his second year of high school. The manga follows Kenichi as he continues to train, and eventually live, at the Ryozanpaku dojo, fighting increasingly capable enemies. He lacks any form of sakki (killer intent) and adheres to a strict code of morals. As a result, Kenichi has made many friends, mostly of former enemies, and wins the affections of Renka Ma, Miu, Izumi, and Li Raichi.

Kenichi's classmate and love interest. Miu came into Hayato's care when his son murdered several of his friends and his wife, sparing Miu by accident. Thereafter Miu learned martial arts from her grandfather. Miu is often clumsy among her fellows, and requires Kenichi's support in making friends. Miu has a great fondness for kittens and becomes hostile towards anyone who harms one. She is prone to rash decisions in money-making.

Miu's grandfather and the elder of the Ryōzanpaku Dojo. He is tall, muscular, and possesses tremendous vitality despite his advanced age. Hayato is a kind old man but still possesses a reckless streak and can be arrogant. He is fond of Kenichi, calling him "Ken-chan", and is the only one who apologizes to him for difficult exercises.

A 30-year-old master of karate. He is a tall man almost always seen wearing a leather jacket and has a long scar across the bridge of his nose.He is often depicted as fierce in conversation and embarrassed by trivial things, and tends to quarrel with others, especially Apachai. He also gambles and drinks frequently and often places bets on Kenichi.

A 28-year-old master of Muay Thai and is known as the "Death God" ("Grim Reaper" in the English anime) of the Muay Thai underworld fighting circuit. He is tall and powerfully built, has tanned skin, and is usually seen wearing a tank top and shorts with bandages wrapped around his hands and feet. Apachai has been fighting life or death battles in underground Muay Thai fights since he was a teenager.

A 23-year-old weapons master, who dresses in a small pink kimono; underneath she wears bandages over her chest and a fundoshi. When fighting seriously, she dons chain mail.

A 38-year-old Jujitsu master, and the first master to train Kenichi. He is an old friend of Miu's father, Saiga. Despite his apparent fragility, he is immensely strong and capable, and can easily interpret other characters' unspoken thoughts. Additionally he has mastered calligraphy, painting, pottery, and sculpting, and builds contraptions as both training devices for Kenichi and power sources for the dojo, including a treadmill generator. He also owns an orthopedic clinic and can reset bones with ease. He has proved to be a good trauma surgeon also, and speaks Russian fluently.

A 42-year-old master of Chinese Kenpō. He is short, balding, and always wears a hat. He has been training in martial arts since he was very young and was the leader of a large martial arts alliance in China, which has 10,000 followers, which he left behind. He has a wife and three children in China.  Kenichi has absolute trust in Ma and has stated that he has never questioned his convictions as a martial artist.

A member of the Newspaper Club at Kenichi's school and has a broad range of expertise, including stealth, lock picking, tinkering, programming, and blackmailing. He retreats from most physical danger; but is also a skilled tactician.

Media

Manga

Syun Matsuena first serialized a manga titled , which ran for 28 chapters in Shogakukan's monthly magazine Shōnen Sunday Super from 1999 to 2002, with its chapters collected in five tankōbon volumes, released from September 18, 2000, to April 18, 2002. Matsuena would later release the remake, Shijō Saikyō no Deshi Ken'ichi, which started in Shogakukan's Weekly Shōnen Sunday on April 17, 2002. The manga finished after 12 years of publication in the magazine on September 13, 2014. Shogakukan collected the chapters into sixty-one tankōbon volumes, published under the Shōnen Sunday Comics imprint, from August 9, 2002, to February 18, 2015.

The series has been licensed in France by Kurokawa and in Italy by Panini Comics.

A gaiden volume was released by Shogakukan on September 18, 2007. A spin-off series, titled  was serialized in Shōnen Sunday S in 2012 and collected in a volume by Shogakukan on September 18, 2012.<ref></p></ref> An official guidebook was released by Shogakukan on May 16, 2014.

Anime

A fifty-episode anime television series adaptation by TMS Entertainment  was broadcast on TV Tokyo from October 7, 2006, to September 29, 2007. The second ending theme for episodes 16–25 is "Catch Your Dream", performed by Joanna Koike. The third ending theme for episodes 26–45 is "Run Over", performed by Joanna Koike. The series' last episode uses the first opening theme "Be Strong" by Kana Yazumi as ending theme.

In North America the series was licensed by Funimation in May 2008. The series was broadcast on Funimation Channel. The rights to the series expired in 2018. In December 2020, Discotek Media announced that they had licensed the anime television series and it will have an upscale release slated for 2021. The series returned to Funimation's streaming service in May 2021. Crunchyroll added the series to their catalog in September 2021.

Original video animation
A 11-episode original video animation (OVA) series produced by Brain's Base started on March 14, 2012. The story continues from the Ragnarok Arc entering the Yomi arc. The 2nd OVA episode, featuring later story in the Yomi arc, was released on June 18, 2012. The 3rd OVA episode was released on November 16, 2012. The 4th and 5th OVA episodes were released on September 16, 2013. The 6th and 7th OVA episodes were released on November 18, 2013. The 8th and 9th OVA episodes were released on February 14, 2014. The 10th and 11th OVA episodes were released on May 16, 2014. The main cast for the OVA series is the same from those of the anime series except for Rie Kugimiya who replaced the late Tomoko Kawakami as Miu and Yuzuru Fujimoto who replaced the late Hiroshi Arikawa as her grandfather Hayato. The episodes aired in Japan in 2014 on Tokyo MX and BS11, with the title . Iori Nomizu performed the opening theme "Wish" (for episodes 4–9) and the ending themes "Glory Days" (for episodes 1–3) and "Breathless" (for episodes 4–9). During its television broadcast, the series featured the opening theme "Higher Ground", performed by Tomokazu Seki, and the same original second ending theme "Breathless", by Iori Nomizu.

Video games
On March 15, 2007, Capcom released the series' first game, Shijō Saikyō no Deshi Ken'ichi: Gekitō! Ragnarok Hachikengō, exclusively on the PlayStation 2.

That same year, another crossover game, Sunday vs Magazine: Shūketsu! Chōjō Daikessen for the PlayStation Portable, also featured Kenichi and related characters.

Kenichi Shirahama appeared in Weekly Shōnen Sunday and Weekly Shōnen Magazine 2009 crossover game Sunday vs Magazine: Shūketsu! Chōjō Daikessen. Characters from the series also appeared in another crossover game of the same magazine, Shōnen Sunday & Shōnen Magazine White Comic, also released in 2009 for Nintendo DS.

Reception
By February 2012, the manga had over 12 million copies in circulation.

Bamboo Dong of Anime News Network, in a negative review of the first season (part one), criticized the series for its repeatability and its presentation as a show that "torn between being a pointless brawl show with fights every episode, and being a semi-legitimate martial arts show", adding that the teaching and explanations of the techniques used in the series are "half-assed" and that other shows like Naruto explain how their moves work in a better way, despite that "those aren't even real". Dong cloncluded: "I really hope there's tons of kids out there right now who are loving this show. Maybe tons of crybabies who need that extra nudge to learn how to get some self-confidence, because then I'd feel like this show did some good. It's also because I can't imagine any grown man or woman enjoying this show, because it's a big ol' dud". In a more positive review of the first season (part two), Bamboo Dong enjoyed the episodes more focused on Kenichi's developing his fighting ability than the early episodes focused on his transformation "from a wimp into a determined martial arts student", as the conflicts are paced more naturally throughout the show. Dong said that the female fanservice of the series is at appropriate levels and that despite it having "leering men and bouncing breasts", he said that Miu is "a great female protagonist, and a good role model. She doesn't take crap from any of the men in the dojo, and she's kind to everyone around her". Dong concluded: KenIchi the Mightiest Disciple is a great choice for people who devour shows like Naruto and Bleach. They're not my cup of tea, but they're well-matched in terms of action and fast-paced storytelling. The fighting in this series is slightly more grounded in reality, too, so it's easier to relate to than throwing fireballs. If you enjoy Shonen Jump-type shows, you should definitely check this out".

Reviewing the first season (part one), Theron Martin of Anime News Network compared the series to the 1984 martial arts film The Karate Kid, noting that the only major difference between the two is that Kenichi "takes itself far less seriously", adding that it is a crucial difference because "much of what goes on in the series is entirely too ridiculous to be taken seriously", although, he praised it for how it handles the overall martial arts theme and the minutiae of martial arts basics that too often get overlooked in many martial arts-related anime. Martin concluded: "The first quarter of KtMD is hardly great anime viewing, as it has an annoying start and some irksome habits, but eventually it becomes surprisingly entertaining in its sampling of various forms of martial arts and the tactics involved in using them efficiently. It's cheesy and often silly, but fun".

In his review of the series' first season (part one), Davey C. Jones of active Anime made positive comments about the series, praising it for its fight scenes and humor, adding that it "has everything. It has buxom babes with lethal skills and one hilarious hormonal and all around great guy as the main character", ultimately calling it "the perfect one-two punch of comedy and martial arts action!". In another review of the second season (part two), Jones also wrote: "Kenichi is the greatest blend of comedy and martial arts since Ranma! You’ve got to see it to believe it! Adrenalin driven martial arts action and big laughs combine for a knockout in anime fun!".

In a review of the first season (part one), C.M. Brendelson of Otaku USA described Kenichi as "the stereotypical Peter Parker-esque high school student – skinny, klutzy, and social awkward" and Miu as "incredibly curvaceous for a teenage girl and has a charming face that never quits" and a "badass martial arts master". In comparing the series to other martial arts titles, like Naruto or Baki the Grappler, Brendelson wrote that the action scenes of the series focuses on Kenichi "getting his ass-kicked and then somehow succeeding after utilizing a freshly learned martial arts technique", and that rather than wanting to always "be the best", Kenchi "really just wants to protect those around him". Regarding the series' fanservice, Brendelson said that it encompasses so much of the action displayed on the screen, but that it is totally within this show’s parameters and that never once does it detract from the main story arc. Brendelson concluded: "The show certainly isn’t for everyone, but if you enjoy a light-hearted romp with a few action sequences thrown in, Kenichi: The Mightiest Disciple may be just up your alley".

Allen Moody of THEM Anime Reviews called the titular character "the perfect character for audience identification", due to his determination and high principles, also making positive comments about the series' characters and actions scenes, however, he criticized it for some "maudlin melodrama" scenes continuing unabated into the midst of a fight.

See also
Waza no Tabibito, another manga by the same author
Tokiwa Kitareri!!, another manga series by the same author
Kimi wa 008, another manga series by the same author

Notes

References

External links
Manga official website at Web Sunday 
 
 
 
 
Anime official website at Funimation

 
2002 manga
2006 anime television series debuts
2007 Japanese television series endings
2012 anime OVAs
Adventure anime and manga
Anime series based on manga
Brain's Base
Comedy anime and manga
Discotek Media
Funimation
Karate in anime and manga
Martial arts anime and manga
Martial arts television series
Muse Communication
Shogakukan manga
Shōnen manga
TMS Entertainment
TV Tokyo original programming